Patricia Vico (born August 27, 1972 in Madrid) is a Spanish actress. The role that made her famous was as Fifa in the comedy television series La casa de los líos (1996-2000)

From 2004 to 2011 she was a cast member on the medical drama series Hospital Central.

In 2015 she was a main character in the horror television series Rabia.

Television
La noche de Hermida (1992) Antena 3
Encantada de la vida (1993) Antena 3
Los ladrones van a la oficina (1993) Antena 3
Hermanos de leche (1994) Antena 3
Sólo para inteligentes TVE
Yo, una mujer (1996) Antena 3
La casa de los líos (1996) Antena 3
Paraíso (serie de televisión) (2000–2003) TVE
Diez en Ibiza (2004) TVE
7 vidas (2000) Telecinco
Esencia de poder (2001) Telecinco
Hospital Central (2004–2010) Telecinco
El Señor de los Cielos (2017) Telemundo

Film
Sabor latino (1996), by Pedro Carvajal
Libertarias (1996), by Vicente Aranda
Un Asunto Privado (1996), by Imanol Arias
Dile a Laura que la quiero (1997), by José Miguel Juárez
Pacto de brujas (2003), by Javier Elorrieta
El asombroso mundo de Borjamari y Pocholo (2004), by Juan Cavestany and Enrique López Lavigne
Íntimos (2005), by Frank Spano
Andy O'Neill The Musical (2005), by Christopher Edwards
La Ira (2009), by Daniel Calparsoro
Sorry If I Call You Love'' (2014)

References

External links
Website of Patricia Vico
Pizquita

Spanish television actresses
Actresses from Madrid
1972 births
Living people
20th-century Spanish actresses
21st-century Spanish actresses